Zgornja Luša is a settlement in the Municipality of Škofja Loka in the Upper Carniola region of Slovenia.

References

External links

Zgornja Luša at Geopedia

Populated places in the Municipality of Škofja Loka